Petrotel Lukoil Refinery  is one of the largest Romanian oil refineries and one of the largest in Eastern Europe, located in Ploieşti, Prahova County.  Its main activity is the processing of Romanian and Russian oil, but a separate unit is specialised in biodiesel production and another unit specialises in energy production. Russian oil is transported by oil tankers from the Novorossiysk Commercial Sea Port, unloaded at an oil terminal located in the Port of Constanţa, and transported to the refinery by rail or by a  underground pipeline that links the refinery to the port. In 2004, the refinery underwent a major modernization that reduced the production capacity of 3.5 million tonnes/year to 2.4 million tonnes/year but made the refinery more efficient, with a higher percentage of use. The refinery also has a biodiesel producing capacity of 100,000 tonnes and the energy division has a gas-fired turbine with a nominal capacity of 30MW.

History
The Petrotel refinery was established in 1904 as the Romanian-American Refinery with an annual processing capacity of 80,000 tonnes. It became a strategic target in World War II and was bombarded by the allied powers in a small raid in June 1942, then in a much larger series of missions, Operation Tidal Wave in August 1943, in an effort to destroy the Axis' oil fields and refineries. The refinery area quickly became the third most heavily defended target in Europe, after Berlin and Vienna. 

In 1979 the refinery was renamed Teleajen after the nearby Teleajen River and held this name until 1998 when it was privatised and sold to the Russian company Lukoil for US$ 53 million; with this sale, the refinery's name became Petrotel-Lukoil.

References

External links
Official site

Oil and gas companies of Romania
Oil refineries in Romania
Lukoil
Companies based in Ploiești